The World Indigenous Games is a multisport event, which involves over 2,000 indigenous athletes competing against one another. These athletes come from all across the world to unite and compete fairly in this event (approximately 30 countries) (2015). Throughout the first three days athletes mingle and bond in their area of sport/games before entering the ten-day competition. The Games are governed by the Inter Tribal Council, a Brazilian indigenous peoples NGO that has staged Brazil's national Indigenous Games since 1996. The first edition of the Games was held in Palmas, Brazil, from October 23 to November 1, 2015, while the second (and most recent) was hosted by Alberta, Canada in 2017. The Games are expected to be held intermittently thereafter, and will feature competitive sports and non-competitive demonstration events. Throughout history, indigenous peoples have had many traditional sports and dances. It is through their history that they have turned these into competitive games and have made it an influential impact on the world and their people's culture. These games consist of body paint replacing sportswear, bare feet instead of sneakers and a looser conception of competition that comes with little value to winning.

The WIN Games are a multisport event structured similar to the Olympics, but with the addition of traditional Indigenous events. The main idea of the games is to focus on reconciliation and the notion that “everyone is welcomed”, exemplified when a group of Syrian refugees were allowed to form a soccer team and compete in the Canada WIN Games. International sporting events have become a means to project positive images and garner social, political, and/or economic benefits for their communities. Organizers and indigenous stakeholders wanted to use the WIN Games to address challenges faced by Indigenous communities such as: stereotypes, lack of resources and opportunities for Indigenous youth, and vulnerability of Indigenous women.

History 
The WIN Games were first proposed at a global conference of aboriginal leaders in 1977 by Wilton Littlechild, a 50-time provincial, regional, national and international champion who has been inducted into seven sports hall of famer. Littlechild advocated for the event for about 40 years and met with a lot of resistance (lack of support from government, financial restraints), until the games finally came to life in 2015. More than 2,000 athletes and cultural delegates participated in the first WIN Games, which were considered a cultural success despite the event being chaotic and disorganized.

The World Indigenous Games grew from the Brazilian Indigenous Peoples Games. There have been 12 editions of the national games, during which approximately 1,500 athletes took part. The World Indigenous Games, also known as the Indigenous Olympics, is similar to any other Olympic Games. It started with a variety of sports, traditional opening and closing ceremonies and indigenous participants from all over the world.

Historical Body Paint – Body painting is an ancient tradition that carries deep meaning and value for its people. The art contains a high-spirited significance to the Indigenous people and is thus the reason why they must wear body paint during the games. It is a sign of respect for their land and represents all their people in one. Different designs represent different family relationships, social position, tribe, ancestors and tracts of land. For example, B. Spencer states that in Arnhem Land the people decorate the bodies of young boys for initiation ceremonies. They are painted in tribe/clan totems on the upper body and thighs. Every little detail has a meaning and represents something. This comes down to the design, the colour, the placing of design and who it is put on to.

Events and competitions 
The World Indigenous Games consist of many events and competitions. Participants compete in a variety of sporting events. These include Western style competitions such as football and athletics as well as many traditional games: rustic race, spear toss, traditional canoeing, corrida de tora, xikunahati. Events such as archery, swimming, wrestling and tug of war are also a part of these games. Many events are non-competitive. This is to show and demonstrate the respect of heritage. They do this by playing traditional sports and celebrating with dances. Many other non-competitive events showcase the celebration of their culture. They include this in the games by forming social forums, activities for the indigenous women and lectures and fairs for all to join and listen to. It is expected that indigenous people run the Olympics however, important guests could be invited to talk or take part somehow in the games. The main reason for the games is to bring all indigenous people together from around the world. This creates greater diversity and helps express indigenous cultures and traditions.

The second WIN Games (Alberta, Canada) started on July 3, 2017 and ended July 9, 2017. About 1600 athletes from all over the world competed on Indigenous lands, entertaining over 20,000 total spectators (free to attend). Events included: opening and closing ceremonies, traditional and contemporary games, a global business forum, youth conference, education conference, discussion forums on lands, resources and climate change, upholding and implementing Treaty rights, sovereignty and traditional knowledge, and an international Elders gathering. Representatives from 29 countries took part in the opening ceremonies and participated in events including: spear throw, tug of strength, log races, Mexican version of hockey (puck is on fire), Brazil's jikunahati (like soccer except players whack a small ball only with their heads), canoeing, Indian horse relays, lacrosse, Denesuline hand games, bow and arrow, swimming and soccer. No information regarding awards/prizes was found.

Traditional games

Wild tree-trunk 

This game is a crowd favourite, and is similar to a relay. Nine or more participants are expected to sprint 500 metres each around a red dirt arena. Whilst running they carry a 100 kg chunk of tree on their shoulders.

Archery 

Participants' bodies are covered with traditional paintings and have to be bare chested. They then line up on a palm of leaves with their bows, 40 metres away from their target. Their target is small fish leaping in and out of the water. Those who spear the most fish gain the points. The highest possible score to achieve is done by drilling the arrow right into the eye.

Xikunahati 

This particular event resembles football. However no body part but the head is allowed to touch the ball.

Overall these Olympics are not about competition but are about celebration.

List of World Indigenous Games

Media Coverage 
As mentioned earlier, the WIN Games were based on the Olympic model, but organizers wanted to make sure the cultural component of Indigenous traditions was included. Dozens of Indigenous languages were used (along with traditional languages like English). Additionally, the focus was on traditional sports and games rather than on mainstream sports in order to not lose the traditional essence. Canadian mainstream media provided extensive coverage for Indigenous stakeholders during the 2017 WIN Games to give attention to the issues faced by Indigenous groups. The authors argue that these challenges faced were linked to the lasting effect of government's formal assimilation policies on Indigenous communities, the lack of culturally relevant education in school settings, and the urban environment within which many Indigenous youths are growing up. Of 147 articles collected, all of them had some content related to Indigenous peoples involved in the events and 122 featured direct quotations from Indigenous peoples or featured substantive coverage as part of the news stories.

Participating countries 
Over 30 countries participate in the Indigenous Games. Within that 30 more than 2000 athletes participate. Some countries that perform in these games are listed below.
 Argentina
 Australia
 Brazil
 Canada
 Chile
 Colombia
 Congo
 Ecuador
 Ethiopia
 French Guiana
 Guatemala
 Mexico
 Mongolia
 New Zealand
 Nicaragua
 Panama
 Paraguay
 Peru
 Philippines (Aeta, Dumagat, Ifugao peoples)
 Russia
 United States of America
 Uruguay
 Venezuela

Facts 
The WIN games in Brazil, hosted in Palmas, capital of the state of Tocantins, were developed on a partnership led by the Municipality of Palmas, under the administration of mayor Carlos Franco Amastha, the Intertribal Committee, ran by chiefs Carlos and Marcos Terena and the Ministry of Sports of Brazil. Over 300 international media and press companies covered the event, 3000 athletes competed, and the 10 days programme was followed by an audience of 10.000 people on a daily basis. The opening ceremony was attended by former president of Brazil Dilma Rousseff and several indigenous leaders and diplomatic representatives of the 30 participant countries.
The WIN Games in Canada, the second edition, had the "Friendship Spear", symbol of the Games, passed by Mayor Carlos Amastha, host of the 1st World Games in history to chief Willie Littlechild, Canadian representative.

See also
 Indigenous Peoples' Games
 North American Indigenous Games

References

Further reading

External links 
 North American Indigenous Games Council Official Website   
 Staff writers. "2006 Indigenous Games wrap up in Denver," Indian Country Today Indian Country Today Media Network
 North American Indigenous Games 2014 Official Website    

Indigenous sports and games of the Americas
First Nations sportspeople
Métis sportspeople
Canadian Inuit sportspeople